A message broker (also known as an integration broker or interface engine) is an intermediary computer program module that translates a message from the formal messaging protocol of the sender to the formal messaging protocol of the receiver. Message brokers are elements in telecommunication or computer networks where software applications communicate by exchanging formally-defined messages. Message brokers are a building block of message-oriented middleware (MOM) but are typically not a replacement for traditional middleware like MOM and remote procedure call (RPC).

Overview
A message broker is an architectural pattern for message validation, transformation, and routing. It mediates communication among applications, minimizing the mutual awareness that applications should have of each other in order to be able to exchange messages, effectively implementing decoupling.

Purpose 
The primary purpose of a broker is to take incoming messages from applications and perform some action on them. Message brokers can decouple end-points, meet specific non-functional requirements, and facilitate reuse of intermediary functions. For example, a message broker may be used to manage a workload queue or message queue for multiple receivers, providing reliable storage, guaranteed message delivery and perhaps transaction management.

Life cycle 
The following represent other examples of actions that might be handled by the broker:

Route messages to one or more destinations
Transform messages to an alternative representation
Perform message aggregation, decomposing messages into multiple messages and sending them to their destination, then recomposing the responses into one message to return to the user
Interact with an external repository to augment a message or store it
Invoke web services to retrieve data
Respond to events or errors
Provide content and topic-based message routing using the publish–subscribe pattern

Message brokers are generally based on one of two fundamental architectures: hub-and-spoke and message bus. In the first, a central server acts as the mechanism that provides integration services, whereas with the latter, the message broker is a communication backbone or distributed service that acts on the bus. Additionally, a more scalable multi-hub approach can be used to integrate multiple brokers.

List of message broker software
Amazon Web Services (AWS) Amazon MQ
Amazon Web Services (AWS) Kinesis
Apache ActiveMQ
Apache Artemis
Apache Kafka
Apache Qpid
Apache Pulsar
Cloverleaf (Enovation Lifeline - NL)
Comverse Message Broker (Comverse Technology)
Eclipse Mosquitto MQTT Broker (Eclipse Foundation)
EMQX EMQX MQTT Broker
Enduro/X Transactional Message Queue (TMQ)
Financial Fusion Message Broker (Sybase)
Fuse Message Broker (enterprise ActiveMQ)
Gearman
Google Cloud Pub/Sub (Google)
HiveMQ HiveMQ MQTT Broker
HornetQ (Red Hat) (Now part of Apache Artemis)
IBM App Connect
IBM MQ
JBoss Messaging (JBoss)
JORAM
Microsoft Azure Service Bus (Microsoft)
Microsoft BizTalk Server (Microsoft)
MigratoryData (a publish/subscribe WebSockets message broker written to address the C10M problem )
NATS (MIT Open Source License, written in Go)
NanoMQ MQTT Broker for IoT Edge
Open Message Queue
Oracle Message Broker (Oracle Corporation)
RabbitMQ (Mozilla Public License, written in Erlang)
Redis An open source, in-memory data structure store, used as a database, cache and message broker.
SAP PI (SAP AG)
SMC SMC Platform
Solace PubSub+
Spread Toolkit
Tarantool, a NoSQL database, with a set of stored procedures for message queues
TIBCO Enterprise Message Service 
WSO2 Message Broker
ZeroMQ

See also
Publish–subscribe pattern
MQTT
Comparison of business integration software
Message-oriented middleware

References

Middleware
Software design patterns